House of Keawe (Keawe Dynasty; Hawaiian: Hale o Keawe) is a name of one royal house in ancient Hawaii. The dynasty was founded by the King Keaweʻīkekahialiʻiokamoku of Hawaii.

Etymology 
This dynasty bears the name of Keaweʻīkekahialiʻiokamoku, who was also known as Keawe II.

He himself was named after the King Keawenui of Hawaii.

In the Hawaiian language, the word has several meanings. Keawe means southern cross and is said to be the name of an ancient chief as well as meaning; "the bearer" (ke-a-we).

Members 
Keaweʻīkekahialiʻiokamoku – King of Hawaii, son of Queen Keākealaniwahine
Lonomaʻaikanaka – First wife of Keaweʻīkekahialiʻiokamoku and daughter of Piʻilaniwahine of Maui
Kalanikauleleiaiwi – Half-sister and second wife of Keaweʻīkekahialiʻiokamoku
Kanealai – Third wife of Keaweʻīkekahialiʻiokamoku and Queen of Molokai 
Kalaninuiamamao – Son of Keaweʻīkekahialiʻiokamoku
Kalanikeʻeaumoku – Son of Keaweʻīkekahialiʻiokamoku and his half-sister
Keawemauhili – Chief of Hilo, Hawaii
Kamakaimoku – Wife of Kalaninuiamamao and Kalanikeʻeaumoku
Alapaiwahine – Daughter of Kalaninuiamamao
Kalaniʻōpuʻu – King of Hawaii
Keōua – Son of Keeaumoku (House of Keoua)

References

 
Royalty of Hawaii (island)